Mount Wedel-Jarlsberg is an ice-covered mountain between Cooper Glacier and Bowman Glacier, standing 2 nautical miles (3.7 km) southwest of Mount Ruth Gade in the Quarles Range. Discovered in December 1911 by Roald Amundsen, and named by him for Alice Wedel-Jarlsberg (1861–1913), first wife of Fritz Wedel Jarlsberg (1855-1942), a Norwegian diplomat.

References

Other sources
Amundsen, O. Delphin (1947) Den Kongelige norske Sankt Olavs orden 1847–1947 (Oslo: Grøndahl & Søns Forlag)

Mountains of the Ross Dependency
Amundsen Coast